Eupithecia vinibua is a moth in the family Geometridae. It is found in Kashmir.

The wingspan is about 15.5 mm. The fore- and hindwings are dark greyish brown.

References

Moths described in 2008
vinibua
Moths of Asia